Railway Chateau Cemetery (referred to as Railway Chateau British Cemetery on the entrance stone) is a Commonwealth War Graves Commission (CWGC) burial ground for the dead of the First World War located in Belgium in the Ypres Salient on the Western Front.

The cemetery grounds were assigned to the United Kingdom in perpetuity by King Albert I of Belgium in recognition of the sacrifices made by the British Empire in the defence and liberation of Belgium during the war.

Foundation
This small cemetery was originally established as Augustine Street Cabaret Cemetery in November 1914. It was also known as L.4 Post Cemetery.

The cemetery was designed by W H Cowlishaw.

References

External links
 
 Railway Chateau Cemetery at Find a Grave

Commonwealth War Graves Commission cemeteries in Belgium
Cemeteries and memorials in West Flanders